Reynard Motorsport vehicles

The Reynard 99I is an open-wheel racing car designed and built by Reynard Racing Cars that competed in the 1999 IndyCar season. It was extremely dominant winning 18 out of the 20 races that season, including the season-opener at Miami. It later won both the constructors' and drivers' titles later that year, being driven by Juan Pablo Montoya.

References

American Championship racing cars
Reynard Motorsport vehicles